Home Township is a civil township of Montcalm County in the U.S. state of Michigan.  As of the 2000 census, the township population was 2,708.

Communities
The Cedar Lake post office, with ZIP code 48812, provides P.O. Box service for the community. The community developed around a railroad station and was platted in 1876. Frederick H. Harlin became the first postmaster on July 26, 1876 and was named for its location in an area of cedar trees.
 Edmore is a village within the township and the Edmore ZIP code 48829 serves most of Home Township as well as portions of Belvidere Township to the west, Douglass Township to the southwest, Day Township to the south, Ferris Township to the southeast, Richland Township to the east, and Rolland Township to the north in Isabella County.
In 1879, Wyman was platted as "Averyville" by O.W. Avery and a post office was established under that name with Harvey P. Wyman as the first postmaster. The post office was renamed Wyman in 1880 and operated until 1944. It was also a station on the Detroit, Lansing and Northern Railroad.
 The community of Vestaburg is to the east in Richland Township and the Vestaburg ZIP code 48891 also serves portions of eastern Home Township.
 The community of Blanchard is to the north in Rolland Township of Isabella County and the Blanchard ZIP code 49310 also serves portions of northern Home Township.
School Districts
Montabella Community Schools
Vestaburg Community Schools

Geography
According to the United States Census Bureau, the township has a total area of 36.1 square miles (93.5 km2), of which 36.0 square miles (93.2 km2) is land and 0.1 square mile (0.3 km2) (0.30%) is water.

Demographics
As of the census of 2000, there were 2,708 people, 1,033 households, and 753 families residing in the township. The racial makeup of the township was 96.42% White, 0.26% African American, 0.52% Native American, 0.07% Asian, 0.85% from other races, and 1.88% from two or more races. Hispanic or Latino of any race were 3.14% of the population.

There were 1,033 households, out of which 36.7% had children under the age of 18 living with them, 57.3% were married couples living together, 10.2% had a female householder with no husband present, and 27.1% were non-families. 23.8% of all households were made up of individuals, and 11.7% had someone living alone who was 65 years of age or older.  The average household size was 2.59 and the average family size was 3.05.

In the township the population was spread out, with 28.5% under the age of 18, 7.5% from 18 to 24, 27.6% from 25 to 44, 20.8% from 45 to 64, and 15.6% who were 65 years of age or older.  The median age was 36 years. For every 100 females, there were 94.4 males.  For every 100 females age 18 and over, there were 91.1 males.

The median income for a household in the township was $30,590, and the median income for a family was $40,061. Males had a median income of $28,462 versus $21,950 for females. The per capita income for the township was $14,522.  About 12.4% of families and 16.3% of the population were below the poverty line, including 19.9% of those under age 18 and 13.8% of those age 65 or over.

Notable people 

 Walker Evans, champion off-road truck racer and NASCAR driver and team owner

Unusual attraction
A two-story outhouse is all that remains of an old factory or office.

References

Townships in Montcalm County, Michigan
Townships in Michigan